José Luis Cabrera may refer to:

José Luis Cabrera (1767–1837), one of the signatories of the Venezuelan Declaration of Independence
José Luis Cabrera Cava (born 1982), Spanish footballer who played as a defensive midfielder
Jose Luis Cabrera (artist) (born 1984), American artist